Amilly is the name of the following communes in France:

 Amilly, Eure-et-Loir, in the Eure-et-Loir department
 Amilly, Loiret, in the Loiret department